Nong Doen is a tambon (subdistrict) of Bung Khla District, in Bueng Kan Province, Thailand. In 2020 it had a total population of 3,797 people.

Administration

Central administration
The tambon is subdivided into 7 administrative villages (muban).

Local administration
The whole area of the subdistrict is covered by the subdistrict administrative organization (SAO) Nong Doen (องค์การบริหารส่วนตำบลหนองเดิ่น).

References

External links
Thaitambon.com on Nong Doen

Tambon of Bueng Kan province
Populated places in Bueng Kan province
Bung Khla District